St. Augustine's Church is a Catholic church in Kulasekharam, Tamil Nadu, India. It lies between the Y cut road of Thirparapu Falls and Pechiparai Dam, and near to St. Ursula's Girls' Higher Secondary School.

The church is located within the Roman Catholic Diocese of Kuzhithurai. The church was started by the ICM sisters who came from different locations and spread Christianity to the people in a small tent. Later, people decided to build a Christian church and kept the name St. Augustine's Church. The church was built and opened on August 28, 1930.

References

Roman Catholic churches in Tamil Nadu